Graham Roland is an American writer and producer. In 2022, he created the crime thriller series Dark Winds on AMC.

Career 
Roland is known for his work as a writer on the FOX series Prison Break and on the final season of the ABC mystery series Lost. He also worked as a writer and co-producer on Fringe.

He served as a writer and co-producer on the FOX crime/horror series Almost Human until it was cancelled on April 29, 2014. In 2015, he wrote two episodes of the United States remake of The Returned and has produced all 10-episodes of the first season. He wrote the story and executive produced the Mark Wahlberg espionage action thriller Mile 22, directed by Peter Berg. He is currently working on the action political thriller web television series Jack Ryan, based on characters from the fictional "Ryanverse" created by Tom Clancy. He co-created it with Carlton Cuse.

Personal life 
He is also an Iraq War veteran who served in the United States Marine Corps from 2000 to 2006.
He is of Native American heritage. Roland is a Chickasaw Nation citizen.

Filmography

References

External links 
 

Living people
United States Marines
United States Marine Corps personnel of the Iraq War
American film producers
American male screenwriters
American television producers
American television writers
American male television writers
Year of birth missing (living people)
Place of birth missing (living people)
Chickasaw people